This article is about the particular significance of the year 1842 to Wales and its people.

Incumbents
Lord Lieutenant of Anglesey – Henry Paget, 1st Marquess of Anglesey 
Lord Lieutenant of Brecknockshire – Penry Williams
Lord Lieutenant of Caernarvonshire – Peter Drummond-Burrell, 22nd Baron Willoughby de Eresby 
Lord Lieutenant of Cardiganshire – William Edward Powell
Lord Lieutenant of Carmarthenshire – George Rice, 3rd Baron Dynevor 
Lord Lieutenant of Denbighshire – Robert Myddelton Biddulph   
Lord Lieutenant of Flintshire – Robert Grosvenor, 1st Marquess of Westminster 
Lord Lieutenant of Glamorgan – John Crichton-Stuart, 2nd Marquess of Bute 
Lord Lieutenant of Merionethshire – Edward Lloyd-Mostyn, 2nd Baron Mostyn
Lord Lieutenant of Monmouthshire – Capel Hanbury Leigh
Lord Lieutenant of Montgomeryshire – Edward Herbert, 2nd Earl of Powis
Lord Lieutenant of Pembrokeshire – Sir John Owen, 1st Baronet
Lord Lieutenant of Radnorshire – George Rodney, 3rd Baron Rodney

Bishop of Bangor – Christopher Bethell 
Bishop of Llandaff – Edward Copleston 
Bishop of St Asaph – William Carey 
Bishop of St Davids – Connop Thirlwall

Events
12 April – Chartist Convention meets in London to arrange to submit another petition to parliament. Delegates include Morgan Williams, who brings with him a petition signed by 36,000 people from south Wales.
7 May – John Bennion of Flintshire, and his wife Elizabeth, arrive in Nauvoo on the John Cummins to join the Mormon community.
12 June – The first Welsh language service in Waukesha County, USA, is held at Bronyberllan, home of Richard "King" Jones.
July
The Rebecca Riots, which had seen sporadic outbreaks in 1839, begin in earnest.
Boughrood bridge completed over the River Wye.
August – Workers at Cyfarthfa and Penydarren ironworks join the general strike.
30 August – Sir William Nott defeats the Afghans at Ghazni.
10 October – The Town Dock at Newport is opened.
date unknown
Missionary Thomas Jones produces his first Khasi Reader and his translation of a Welsh-language work Rhodd Mam ("A Mother's Gift") into the Khasi language.
A Royal Commission chaired by Robert Hugh Franks reports on the employment of children in the coal industry in South Wales. They find that children as young as six are working twelve-hour shifts underground.
A stone viaduct is built to carry the Glyncorrwg Railway.
Henry Robertson arrives in Wales to work as an engineer. Later he settles near Wrexham and builds Palé Hall.
John Cory and his family move to the docks area of Cardiff and open a ship's chandlery business.
Henry Hussey Vivian takes over the management of the Liverpool branch of the firm of Vivian and Sons.
A Calvinistic Methodist mission to "the Welsh people in France" is established by Rev James Williams and his wife in Brittany.
Two explosions at the Blackvein Colliery in Crosskeys result in a total of five deaths.

Arts and literature

New books
Charles James Apperley (Nimrod) – The Life of a Sportsman
Anne Beale – Poems
Thomas Price (Carnhuanawc) – A History of Wales to the Death of Llywelyn ap Gruffydd, vol. 14

Music
John Orlando Parry – Anticipations of Switzerland

Births
12 February – Megan Watts Hughes, singer (died 1907)
11 March – Sarah Edith Wynne, singer (died 1897)
15 April – John Hughes (Glanystwyth), minister (died 1902)
14 June – William Abraham (Mabon), politician (died 1922)
28 September – William John Parry, quarrymen's leader (died 1927)
31 October – Moses Owen Jones, musician (died 1908)
19 December – Daniel Thomas Phillips, minister and American consul (died 1905)

Deaths
26 May – Benjamin Heath Malkin, antiquary and author, 73
September – William Ouseley, orientalist, 73
10 November – John Jones of Ystrad, politician, 65
22 December – Thomas Phillips, minister and writer, 70

References

Wales